Political insult refers to a statement from a politician about another one which contains disdainful purpose or notorious offense. They are not defined in any political protocol.

Notable political insults
 1858, Abraham Lincoln, on Stephen Douglas: "His argument is as thin as the homeopathic soup that was made by boiling the shadow of a pigeon that had starved to death."
1922, Georges Clemenceau, French statesman on David Lloyd George, British politician: "Oh, if I could piss the way he speaks!"
 1989, Paul Keating, Australian Prime Minister on John Howard, Australian politician: “He’s just a shiver looking for a spine to run up.”
1999, Mustafa Tlass, Syrian minister of Defense called Yaser Arafat "son of 60,000 whores".
 2006, Hugo Chavez, president of Venezuela named George Bush (President of United States) "devil". (See 2006 Chávez speech at the United Nations)
 2010, Mohammad-Javad Larijani, Iranian Secretary of High Council for Human rights, called Barack Obama, President of the United States "Kaka Siah", a Persian term akin to "nigger."
2013, John McCain, U.S. Senator, compared Mahmoud Ahmadinejad, President of Islamic republic of Iran with the monkeys by tweeting:"So Ahmadinejad wants to be first Iranian in space – wasn't he just there last week? "Iran launches monkey into space"".
 2013, Benjamin Netanyahu, Prime Minister of Israel called Hasan Rouhani, President of Islamic republic of Iran, "a wolf in sheep's clothing".
 2014, Tony Abbott, prime minister of Australia offended Vladimir Putin, president of Russia by saying "shirtfront".
 2016, Rodrigo Duterte, president of Philippine used the words "Son of a whore" and "Go to the hell" for Barack Obama, President of the United States. Duterte has also said some offenses about European Union, United Nations, Pope and God in his official speeches.
 2016, Donald Trump and Hillary Clinton, United States presidential election of 2016 nominees have insulted each other in presidential debates. Trump has a long history of using unflattering monikers and slurs against various political opponents.
2019, Paul Keating on Scott Morrison, Prime Minister of Australia: "He's a fossil with a baseball cap".

References

Politics
Political terminology
Linguistic controversies
Abuse
Political quotes